All Hands on Deck is a 2020 French comedy film directed by Guillaume Brac. It was selected to be shown in the Panorama section at the 70th Berlin International Film Festival.

Cast
 Salif Cissé
 Asma Messaoudene
 Soundos Mosbah
 Benjamin Natchouang

References

External links
 

2020 films
2020 comedy films
2020s French-language films
French comedy films
2020s French films